Sedibeng is one of the districts of the Gauteng province of South Africa. The administrative seat of Sedibeng is Vereeniging. The most widely spoken language among its 794,605 inhabitants is Sesotho (2001 Census).

Socioeconomic situation
The total population of Sedibeng accounts for only 9% of the total Gauteng population of 8.84 million. This means that in 2001 Sedibengs's population was approximately 794 600 (Stats SA, 2001 CENSUS). The growth rate for Gauteng was 3.75% p.a and 2% p.a for Sedibeng during 2003 (Stats SA).
In terms of the economy the district is dominated by manufacturing, which contributed roughly 32% to the local economy during 2001. Manufacturing in the district is dominated by the fabricated metal and the chemical sectors (Mittal Steel Company (previously ISCOR) and Sasol. The local economy has been stagnating for a number of years, with a net loss in formal job opportunities. Economic sectors which do present opportunities for further local development and economic growth include agriculture and tourism.

Environmental
Some of Sedibeng's natural resources are:
The Vaal River. At times however, the river is polluted by untreated sewage from this municipality.
Vaal Dam, a tourist attraction and source of water even beyond the boundaries of Sedibeng
Suikerbosrand Nature Reserve, a protected area in the Suikerbosrand Range
Aquifers, which are an important source of water in rural areas

Corruption
In 2020 the Department of Cooperative Governance (DCoG) decided to act against council members who in 2018 approved a large raise in salary for their municipal manager Stanley Khanyile. In 2020 Khanyile was shot and killed in Meyersdal, Alberton, before he could appear on charges of fraud, theft and money laundering stemming from his term as the head of a department in the Eastern Cape.

Local Municipalities 
Sedibeng District Municipality consists of the three local municipalities, namely Lesedi, Midvaal and Emfuleni. The total number of households in Sedibeng is estimated at 224 307.

Demographics
The following statistics are from the 2001 census.

Gender

Ethnic group

Age

Neighbours
Sedibeng is surrounded by:
 Johannesburg to the north
 Ekurhuleni (East Rand) to the north
 Nkangala in Mpumalanga to the north-east (DC31)
 Gert Sibande in Mpumalanga to the east (DC30)
 Fezile Dabi to the south (DC20)
 Dr Kenneth Kaunda in North West to the west (DC40)
 West Rand to the north-west (CBDC8)

References

External links
Sedibeng District Municipality

District municipalities of Gauteng